Christopher Temple was a Puisne Justice of the Supreme Court of Ceylon from 1854 to 1873. Temple had served as Deputy Queen's Advocate of Ceylon and Judge of the District Court of Colombo prior to being elevated as a Puisne Justice. He was appointed Senior Puisne Justice on 1 January 1863 and acted as Chief Justice when Chief Justice Edward Shepherd Creasy went on leave on 7 September 1869.

References

Citations

Bibliography

 

Puisne Justices of the Supreme Court of Ceylon
British expatriates in Sri Lanka
19th-century British people